Detlef Kahlert (born 1 August 1962) is a German former archer. He competed at the 1984 Summer Olympics and the 1988 Summer Olympics.

References

External links
 

1962 births
Living people
German male archers
Olympic archers of West Germany
Archers at the 1984 Summer Olympics
Archers at the 1988 Summer Olympics
People from Schwerte
Sportspeople from Arnsberg (region)